Joseph Jobling (29 July 1906 – 20 July 1969) was an English professional football wing half who played in the Football League for Charlton Athletic and Norwich City. After retiring from football, he coached and scouted for Charlton Athletic. Between 1956 and 1958 he was manager of Gorleston.

References 

1906 births
1969 deaths
People from Annfield Plain
Footballers from County Durham
Association football wing halves
English footballers
South Pontop Villa F.C. players
Annfield Plain F.C. players
Gorleston F.C. players
Norwich City F.C. players
Charlton Athletic F.C. players
English Football League players
Brentford F.C. wartime guest players
English football managers
Gorleston F.C. managers
West Ham United F.C. wartime guest players

Norwich City F.C. wartime guest players
Watford F.C. wartime guest players
Clapton Orient F.C. wartime guest players
Charlton Athletic F.C. non-playing staff